Lali Gulisashvili (10 April 1955 – 28 January 2022) was a Georgian poet, teacher and philologist.

Life and career 
Gulisashvili was born in the village of Giorgitsminda, Sagarejo Municipality, Georgia on 10 April 1955. She graduated from Tbilisi State University in 1977 as a philologist, and earned a PhD in philology.

Her verses were published in the newspaper Tbilisi State University and other periodical editions from 1972. She was also an author of four poetic collections. Gulisashvili's poems were turned into songs for the film Iavnana (1994), directed by Nana Janelidze. These songs became hits on social networks.

Gulisashvili died in Tbilisi in January 2022, at the age of 66.

Books
 I Go To The Sky Through The Fog, Poems, 2020, 
 To My Son, Poems, Siesta Publishing, 2018
 Prayer For Spring, Poems, Merani Publishing, 1989
 Coming Back To The Old House, Poems, Merani Publishing, 1985

Literary prizes and awards
  Honor Medal, awarded by the President of Georgia by the decree N573 on 31 August 1996

References

Sources
Gulisašvili, Lali
Lali Gulisashvili on The Biographical Dictionary of Georgia

1955 births
2022 deaths
20th-century women writers from Georgia (country)
20th-century writers from Georgia (country)
21st-century women writers from Georgia (country)
21st-century writers from Georgia (country)
People from Kakheti
Poets from Georgia (country)
Philologists from Georgia (country)
Women poets from Georgia (country)
Tbilisi State University alumni
Writers from Georgia (country)